Hamdi Ayed (born 16 August 1993) is a Qatari handball player for Al Sadd and the Qatari national team.

He represented Qatar at the 2019 World Men's Handball Championship.

References

1993 births
Living people
Qatari male handball players